The Service for French Internet Exchange (SFINX) is one of the biggest French IXPs (Internet Exchange Points), along with France-IX and PARIX. It's  PoP's are based in Interxion and Telehouse

It is operated by RENATER, the French National Research and Education Network (NREN).

See also
 List of Internet exchange points
 List of Internet exchange points by size
 Internet exchange
 Peering

External links
SFINX Web Page

Internet exchange points in France
Internet in France